Kieran Wilkinson (born 3 October 1999) is an English rugby union player who plays for Sale Sharks in the Premiership Rugby. He was educated at Kirkham Grammar School.

References

External links
Sale Sharks Profile
ESPN Profile
Ultimate Rugby Profile

1999 births
Living people
English rugby union players
Rugby union players from Blackpool
Sale Sharks players
Rugby union fly-halves
People educated at Kirkham Grammar School